The Sony α5100 (model ILCE-5100) is a digital rangefinder-type mirrorless camera announced by Sony on 18 August 2014.

Reception 
The camera has been well received because of its performance and its features.

Drawbacks and missing features 
One of the main drawbacks is the fake shutter sound that the camera emits when taking a photo, something that many reviewers noted that worsens the experience of taking photos, as the sound cannot be turned off. This fake shutter sound can be clearly heard when shooting at 1/10 s or slower, at faster speeds it is either not emitted or the sound appears to blend in with the mechanical rear curtain shutter sound. This fake shutter sound is probably present in order to indicate to the camera user that the exposure has started, most likely to mimic a mechanical front curtain, as most Sony camera now have electronic front curtains.
Missing from this camera model is a dedicated physical Fn button, standard for most Sony mirrorless cameras.
Also the programmable function menu that can be assigned to one of the programmable buttons, similar to older Sony NEX camera models, is not available.

See also
List of Sony E-mount cameras

References

 http://www.dpreview.com/products/sony/slrs/sony_a5100/specifications

α5100
Live-preview digital cameras
Cameras introduced in 2014